Mercurius (died after 1206) was a Moravian lord in the early 13th century, who settled down in the Kingdom of Hungary. As a confidant of King Andrew II of Hungary, he served as Ban of Slavonia from 1205 to 1206. He became related to the royal Árpád dynasty through his marriage.

Origin
Early, 19th-century historiographical works incorrectly propounded that Mercurius belonged to the powerful Hungarian clan Gutkeled. Since then, it was proved that he was grandfather of that Mérk (Myrk or Mercurius), Wenceslaus and James of the Csákányi family, about whom the 13th century chronicler Simon of Kéza mentions that they descended "from the dukes of Moravia and have ties of kinship with King Béla IV". According to historian Tibor Neumann, it is possible he is identical with one of the lords called Marquartus, whose name appear in contemporary charters from the Kingdom of Bohemia, but he was certainly not member of the Přemyslid dynasty, despite Simon's account.

Career in Hungary
The circumstances of his arrival to Hungary is unknown. Perhaps it occurred in 1198, when King Ottokar I of Bohemia married to Constance of Hungary, the sister of Emeric, King of Hungary and Duke Andrew. A letter of judgment from 1413 mentions that Mercurius was granted the estates Kolon and Kovácsi in Nyitra County (present-day Kolíňany in Slovakia) from King Andrew II around 1205. The monarch also married off his "blood relative" ("consanguinea") Margaret to the Moravian lord. It is possible this Margaret is identical with the daughter of Géza II, who had been widowed twice before as the wife of Isaac Doukas then Andrew, Ban of Slavonia. If this is the place, Mercurius' wife died before 1208. Their marriage produced a son Janur (or Gyánúr), ancestor of the Koloni and Rovi noble families, which flourished until the first half of the 15th century.

Mercurius was installed as Ban of Slavonia in 1205, serving in this capacity until 1206. Beside that, he also administered Somogy County. Thereafter, he functioned as ispán of Pozsony County for a brief time in 1206. At some point in his life (prior to 1213), he sold the land Hagymás in Bihar County (today Hășmaș, Romania) to Boleslaus, Bishop of Vác.

References

Sources

 
 
 

12th-century Bohemian people
13th-century Hungarian people
Bans of Slavonia
Czech expatriates in Hungary